Haplogroup D1 or D-M174 is a subclade of Haplogroup D-CTS3946. This male haplogroup is found primarily in East Asia and the Andaman Islands, though it is also found regularly with low frequency in Central Asia and Mainland Southeast Asia. It's also found as far as Europe and Middle east in lower frequencies.

Origins

Haplogroup D-M174 is believed to have originated in Asia some 60,000 years before present. While haplogroup D-M174 along with haplogroup E contains the distinctive YAP polymorphism (which indicates their closer ancestry than C), no haplogroup D-M174 chromosomes have been found anywhere outside of Asia. Haplogroup D1 is also often associated with "Southern Asian" populations.

Several studies (Hammer et al. 2006, Shinoda 2008, Matsumoto 2009, Cabrera et al. 2018) suggest that the paternal haplogroup D-M174 originated somewhere in Central Asia. According to Hammer et al., haplogroup D-M174 originated between Tibet and the Altai mountains. He suggests that there were multiple waves into Eastern Eurasia.

A 2017 study by Mondal et al. finds that the Riang people (a Tibeto-Burmese population) and the Andamanese share the same D clade (D1a3 also known as D1a2b), and have their closest lineages with other clades in East Asia. The Jarawa and Onge shared this D1a2b with each other within the last ~7000 years. The East Asian D1a2b had diverged from the Japanese D1a2a lineage ~53,000 years ago. The authors concluded that: ”This strongly suggests that haplogroup D does not indicate a separate ancestry for Andamanese populations. Rather, haplogroup D was part of the standing variation carried by the Eastern OOA expansion, and later lost from most of the populations except in Andaman and partially in Japan and Tibet”.

A 2019 study by Haber et al showed that Haplogroup D-M174 originated in Central Asia and evolved as it migrated to different directions of the continent. One group of population migrated to Siberia, others to Japan and Tibet, and another group migrated to the Andaman islands.

A genetic study by Hallast et al. 2020 on ancient and modern haplogroups using a phylogenetic analysis of haplogroup C, D and FT sequences, including very rare deep-rooting lineages (such as D0/D2, a divergent D lineage not belonging to D-M174) argues that the initial splits within haplogroup CT (ancestor of DE) occurred in Africa. They also argue that phylogeographic analyses of ancient and present-day non-African Y chromosomes, all point to East/Southeast Asia as the origin 55,000–50,000 years ago of all known surviving non-African male lineages (apart from recent migrants) soon after an initial 70-55,000 year ago migration from Africa of basal haplogroup D and other basal y-lineages. They argue that these lineages then rapidly expanded across Eurasia, later diversified in southeast Asia and then expanded westwards around 55–50,000 years ago, replacing other local lineages within Eurasia, and conclude that haplogroup D (as D-M174) then underwent rapid expansions within Eastern-Eurasian populations and consists of 5 different branches which formed about 45,000 years ago. They find that these haplogroups currently have their greatest diversity in Eastern Eurasia (east/southeast Asia). Tibeto-Burmese populations of East and Southeast Asia were found to have the highest amount of diversity.

Overview
It is found today at high frequency among populations in Tibet, northern Myanmar, Qinghai, the Japanese archipelago, and the Andaman Islands, though curiously not as much in the rest of India. The Ainu of Japan and various Tibeto-Burmese people (such as the Tripuri people) are notable for possessing almost exclusively Haplogroup D-M174 chromosomes. Haplogroup D-M174 chromosomes are also found at low to moderate frequencies among the Bai, Dai, Han, Hui, Manchu, Miao, Tujia, Xibe, Yao, and Zhuang of China and among several minority populations of Sichuan and Yunnan that speak Tibeto-Burman languages and reside in close proximity to the Tibetans, such as the Jingpo, Jino, Mosuo, Naxi, Pumi, Qiang, and Yi.

Haplogroup D is also found in populations of China proper and Korea, but with much lower frequency than in populations of Tibet and Japan. A study published in 2011 found D-M174 in 2.49% (43/1729) of Han Chinese males, with frequencies of this haplogroup tending to be higher than average toward the north and toward the west of the country (5/56 = 8.9% D-M174 Shaanxi Han, 13/221 = 5.9% D-M174 Gansu Han, 6/136 = 4.4% D-M174 Yunnan Han, 1/27 = 3.7% D-M174 Guangxi Han, 2/61 = 3.3% D-M174 Hunan Han, 2/62 = 3.2% D-M174 Sichuan Han). In another study of Han Chinese Y-DNA published in 2011, Haplogroup D-M174 was observed in 1.94% (7/361) of a sample of unrelated Han Chinese male volunteers at Fudan University in Shanghai, with the origins of most of the volunteers being traced back to East China (Jiangsu, Zhejiang, Shanghai, and Anhui). In Korea, Haplogroup D-M174 has been observed in 3.8% (5/133) of a sample from Daejeon, 3/85 = 3.5% of a sample from Seoul, 3.3% (3/90) of a sample from Jeolla, 2.4% (2/84) of a sample from Gyeongsang, 2.3% (13/573) of another sample from Seoul, 1.4% (1/72) of a sample from Chungcheong, 1.1% (1/87) of a sample from Jeju, and 0.9% (1/110) of a third sample from Seoul-Gyeonggi. In other studies, haplogroup D-M174 has been observed in 6.7% (3/45) and 4.0% (3/75) of samples from Korea without any further specification of the area of sampling. Little high-resolution data regarding the phylogenetic position of Han Chinese and Korean members of Y-DNA Haplogroup D has been published, but the available data suggests that most Han Chinese members of Haplogroup D should belong to clades found frequently among Tibetans (and especially the D-M15 clade, also found among speakers of some Lolo-Burmese and Hmong-Mien languages), whereas most Korean members of Haplogroup D should belong to the D-M55 clade, which is found frequently among Ainu, Ryukyuan, and Japanese people.

Haplogroup D Y-DNA has been found (albeit with low frequency) among modern populations of the Eurasian steppe, such as Southern Altaians (6/96 = 6.3% D-M174(xM15), 6/120 = 5.0% D-P47), Kazakhs (1/54 = 1.9% D-M174, 6/1294 = 0.5% D), Nogais (4/76 = 5.3% D-M174 Kara Nogai, 1/87 = 1.1% D-M174 Kuban Nogai), Khalkhas (1/24 = 4.2% D-M174, 3/85 = 3.5% D-M174, 2/149 D-M15 + 2/149 D-P47 = 4/149 = 2.7% D-M174 total), Zakhchin (2/60 = 3.3% D-M174), Uriankhai (1/60 = 1.7% D-M174), and Kalmyks (5/426 = 1.2% D-M174). It also has been found among linguistically similar (Turkic- or Mongolic-speaking) modern populations of the desert and oasis belt south of the steppe, such as Yugurs, Bao’an, Monguors, Uyghurs, and Uzbeks. In commercial testing, members have been found as far west as Romania in Europe and Iraq in Western Asia.

Unlike haplogroup C-M217, Haplogroup D-M174 is not found in the New World; it is not present in any modern Native American (North, Central or South) populations. While it is possible that it traveled to the New World like Haplogroup C-M217, those lineages apparently became extinct.

Haplogroup D-M174 is also remarkable for its rather extreme geographic differentiation, with a distinct subset of Haplogroup D-M174 chromosomes being found exclusively in each of the populations that contains a large percentage of individuals whose Y-chromosomes belong to Haplogroup D-M174: Haplogroup D-M15 among the Tibetans (as well as among other East Asian and Southeast Asian populations that display low frequencies of Haplogroup D-M174 Y-chromosomes), Haplogroup D-M55 among the various populations of the Japanese Archipelago and with low frequency among Koreans, Haplogroup D-P99 among the inhabitants of Tibet and some other parts of central Eurasia (e.g. Mongolia and the Altai). D-M174* without positive-tested of subclades D-M15 or D-M55 is found at high frequencies among Andaman Islanders and recently Andamanese subclade is found to be D-Y34637 (D1a2b). Another type (or types) of paragroup D-M174* without tested positive subclades of D-M15,D-P47,or D-M55 is found at a very low frequency among the Turkic and Mongolic populations of Central Asia, amounting to no more than 1% in total. This apparently ancient diversification of Haplogroup D-M174 suggests that it may perhaps be better characterized as a "super-haplogroup" or "macro-haplogroup."

In one study, the frequency of Haplogroup D-M174 without tested positive subclades found among Thais was 10%. Su et al. (2000) found DE-YAP/DYS287(xM15) in 11.1% (5/45) of a set of three samples from Thailand (including 20% (4/20) North Thai, 20% (1/5) So, and 0% (0/20) Northeast Thai) and in 16.7% (1/6) of a sample from Guam. Meanwhile, the authors found D-M15 in 15% of a pair of samples of Yao (including 30% (3/10) Yao Jinxiu and 0% (0/10) Yao Nandan), 14.3% (2/14) of a sample of Yi, 3.8% (1/26) of a sample of Cambodians, and 3.6% (1/28) of a sample of Zhuang. Dong et al. (2002) found DE-YAP Y-chromosomes in 12.5% (2/16) of a sample of Jingpo from Luxi City, Yunnan, 10.0% (2/20) of a sample of Dai from Luxi City, Yunnan, and 1.82% (1/55) of a sample of Nu from Gongshan and Fugong counties of Yunnan.

Distribution and subclades
The Haplogroup D-M174 Y-chromosomes that are found among Tibeto-Burman populations as well as people of the Japanese Archipelago (haplogroup D1a2b, D1a2a and D1a1). D-M55 (D1a2a) are particularly distinctive, bearing a complex of at least five individual mutations along an internal branch of the Haplogroup D-M174 phylogeny, thus distinguishing them clearly from the other Haplogroup D-M174 chromosomes that are found among the Tibetans and Andaman Islanders and providing evidence that Y-chromosome Haplogroup D-M55 was the modal haplogroup in the ancestral population that developed the prehistoric Jōmon culture in the Japanese islands.

It is suggested that the majority of D-M174 Y-chromosome carriers migrated from Central Asia to East Asia. One group migrated into the Andaman Islands, thus forming or helping to form the Andamanese people. Another group stayed in modern Tibet and southern China (today Tibeto-Burman peoples) and another group migrated to Japan, possibly via the Korean Peninsula (pre-Jōmon people).

Subclades:

D-Z27276 (D1a1)
Haplogroup D-Z27276 is the common ancestor of D-M15 and D-P99, which are common in Tibet (China).

D-M15 (D1a1a) 
D-M15 was first reported to have been found in a sample from Cambodia and Laos (1/18 = 5.6%) and in a sample from Japan (1/23 = 4.3%) in a preliminary worldwide survey of Y-DNA variation in extant human populations.
 
Subsequently, Y-DNA that belongs to Haplogroup D-M15 has been found frequently among Tibeto-Burman-speaking populations of Southwestern China (including approximately 23% of Qiang, approximately 12.5% of Tibetans, and approximately 9% of Yi) and among Yao people inhabiting northeastern Guangxi (6/31 = 19.4% Lowland Yao, 5/41 = 12.2% Native Mien, 3/41 = 7.3% Lowland Kimmun) with a moderate distribution throughout Central Asia, East Asia, and continental Southeast Asia (Indochina).

A study published in 2011 has found D-M15 in 7.8% (4/51) of a sample of Hmong Daw and in 3.4% (1/29) of a sample of Xinhmul from northern Laos.

D-P47 (D1a1b1)
Found with high frequency among Pumi, Naxi, and Tibetans, with a moderate distribution in Central Asia. According to one study, Tibetans have a frequency of about 41.31% of haplogroup D-P47. Haplogroup D-P47 has been found in 9% of Xi'an Han.

D-Z3660 (D1a2)
For about 7,000 years, the natives of the Andaman Islands shared a common ancestry with each other. The closest lineage to the Andamanese is the Japanese haplogroup D, with which it has a very old relationship, dating back to about 53,000 years.

D-M55 (D1a2a)
Previously known as D-M55, D-M64.1/Page44.1 (D1a2a) is found with high frequency among Ainu and with medium frequency among Japanese and Ryukyuans.

Kim et al. (2011) found Haplogroup D-M55 in 2.0% (1/51) of a sample of Beijing Han and in 1.6% (8/506) of a pool of samples from South Korea, including 3.3% (3/90) from the Jeolla region, 2.4% (2/84) from the Gyeongsang region, 1.4% (1/72) from the Chungcheong region, 1.1% (1/87) from the Jeju region, 0.9% (1/110) from the Seoul-Gyeonggi region, and 0% (0/63) from the Gangwon region. Hammer et al. (2006) found Haplogroup D-P37.1 in 4.0% (3/75) of a sample from South Korea.

Low levels of D-M116.1 (a subclade of D-M55) among males in present-day Timor (0.2% of males), It's found in 9.5% of males from Micronesia（Hammer et al. 2006, is believed to reflect recent admixture from Japan. That is, D-M116.1 (D1a2a1) is generally believed to be a primary subclade of D-M64.1 (D1a2a), possibly as a result of the Japanese military occupation of South East Asia during World War II.

According to Mitsuru Sakitani, Haplogroup D1 arrived from Central Asia to northern Kyushu via the Altai Mountains and the Korean Peninsula more than 40,000 years before present, and Haplogroup D-M55 (D1a2a) was born in Japanese archipelago.

D-Y34637 (D1a2b) 
D1a2b (formerly one of D*) is found at high frequencies among Andaman Islanders especially Onge(23/23 = 100%), Jarawa(4/4 = 100%).

D-L1378 (D1b)

D1b (L1378, M226.2) has been exclusively found in commercial testing in two families from Mactan Island in the Cebu region of the Philippines.

D-M174*

D-M174 (xM15,P99,M55) is found in some Tibetan minority tribes in Northeast India (among whom rates vary from zero to 65%).

The basal D-M174 (xM15,P47,M55) has been found in approximately 5% of Altaians. Kharkov et al. have found haplogroup D*(xD-M15) in 6.3% (6/96) of a pool of samples of Southern Altaians from three different localities, particularly in Kulada (5/46 = 10.9%) and Kosh-Agach (1/7 = 14%), though they have not tested for any marker of the subclade D-M55 or D-P99. Kharkov et al. also have reported finding haplogroup DE-M1(xD-M174) Y-DNA in one Southern Altaian individual from Beshpeltir (1/43 = 2.3%).

Phylogenetics

Phylogenetic history

Prior to 2002, there were in academic literature at least seven naming systems for the Y-Chromosome Phylogenetic tree. This led to considerable confusion. In 2002, the major research groups came together and formed the Y-Chromosome Consortium (YCC). They published a joint paper that created a single new tree that all agreed to use. Latter, a group of citizen scientists with an interest in population genetics and genetic genealogy formed a working group to create an amateur tree aiming at being above all timely.  The table below brings together all of these works at the point of the landmark 2002 YCC Tree. This allows a researcher reviewing older published literature to quickly move between nomenclatures.

Research publications
The following research teams per their publications were represented in the creation of the YCC tree.

Phylogenetic trees
By ISOGG tree（Version: 14.151）.

DE (YAP) Nigeria, Guinea-Bissau, Caribbean, Tibet
D (CTS3946)
D1 (M174/Page30, IMS-JST021355) East Asia, Andaman Islands, Central Asia, Mainland Southeast Asia
D1a (CTS11577)　
D1a1 (F6251/Z27276)
D1a1a (M15) Mainland China, Tibet, Altai Republic
D1a1b (P99) Mainland China, Tibet, Mongol, Central Asia
D1a2(Z3660)
D1a2a (M64.1/Page44.1, M55) Japan（Yamato people、Ryukyuan people、Ainu people）
D1a2b (Y34637) Andaman Islands（Onge people、Jarawa people）
D1b (L1378) Philippines
D2 (A5580.2) Nigeria, Saudi Arabia, Syria, African Americans

See also

Genetics

Y-DNA D-M174 subclades

Y-DNA backbone tree

References

Sources for conversion tables

External links 

Atlas of the Human Journey: Genetic Markers, Haplogroup D-M174 (M174), from The Genographic Project at National Geographic
Famous dna of Japan

D-M174